Agia Varvara is a village of the Katerini municipality. Before the 1997 local government reform it was part of the community of Svoronos. The 2011 census recorded 69 inhabitants in the village. Agia Varvara is a part of the municipal community of Svoronos.

See also
 List of settlements in the Pieria regional unit

References

Populated places in Pieria (regional unit)